Granola is a breakfast and snack food consisting of rolled oats, nuts, honey or other sweeteners such as brown sugar, and sometimes puffed rice, that is usually baked until crisp, toasted and golden brown. The mixture is stirred while baking to avoid burning and to maintain a loose breakfast cereal consistency. Dried fruit, such as raisins and dates, and confections such as chocolate are sometimes added.  Granola is often eaten in combination with yogurt, honey, fresh fruit (such as bananas, strawberries or blueberries), milk or other forms of cereal. It also serves as a topping for various pastries, desserts or ice cream. Muesli is similar to granola, except that it is traditionally neither sweetened nor baked.

Granola is sometimes taken when hiking, camping, or backpacking because it is nutritious, lightweight, high in calories, and easy to store (properties that make it similar to trail mix and muesli). Manufacturers also add honey, corn syrup, or maple syrup to it and compress it into granola bars, which make it easy to carry for packed lunches, hiking, or other outdoor activities.

History 

The names Granula and Granola were registered trademarks in the late 19th century United States for foods consisting of sweetened whole grain products crumbled and then baked until crisp. The name is now a trademark only in Australia and New Zealand, but is still more commonly called muesli there. 

Granula was invented in Dansville, New York by Dr. James Caleb Jackson at the Jackson Sanitarium in 1863. The Jackson Sanitarium was a prominent health spa that operated into the early 20th century on the hillside overlooking Dansville. It was also known as Our Home on the Hillside; thus the company formed to sell Jackson's cereal was known as the Our Home Granula Company. Granula was composed of Graham flour and was similar to an oversized form of Grape-Nuts. A similar cereal was developed by John Harvey Kellogg. It too was initially known as Granula, but the name was changed to Granola to avoid legal problems with Jackson.

The food and name were revived in the 1960s, and fruits and nuts were added to it to make it a health food that was popular with the health and nature-oriented hippie movement. Due to this connection, the descriptors "granola" and "crunchy-granola" have entered colloquial use as a way to label people and things associated with the movement.  

Another major promoter was Layton Gentry, profiled in Time as "Johnny Granola-Seed". In 1964, Gentry sold the rights to a granola recipe using oats, which he claimed to have invented himself, to Sovex Natural Foods for $3,000. The company was founded in 1953 in Holly, Michigan by the Hurlinger family with the main purpose of producing a concentrated paste of brewers yeast and soy sauce known as "Sovex". Earlier in 1964, it had been bought by John Goodbrad and moved to Collegedale, Tennessee. In 1967, Gentry bought back the rights for west of the Rockies for $1,500 and then sold the west coast rights to Wayne Schlotthauer of Lassen Foods in Chico, California, for $18,000. Lassen was founded from a health food bakery run by Schlotthauer's father-in-law.

In 1969, during Woodstock, Lisa Law asked the festival organizers for $3,000 to buy, in New York City, rolled oats, bulgar wheat, wheat germ, dried apricots, currants, almonds, soy sauce, and honey to make muesli, volunteers fed circa 130,000 people with Dixie cups.

In 1972, an executive at Pet Milk, St. Louis, Missouri, introduced Heartland Natural Cereal, the first major commercial granola. At almost the same time, the Quaker Oats Company introduced Quaker 100% Natural Granola. Quaker was threatened with legal action by Gentry, and they subsequently changed the name of their product to Harvest Crunch. Within a year, Kellogg's had introduced its "Country Morning" granola cereal and General Mills had introduced its "Nature Valley". In 1974, McKee Baking (later McKee Foods), makers of Little Debbie snack cakes, purchased Sovex. In 1998, the company also acquired the Heartland brand and moved its manufacturing to Collegedale. In 2004, Sovex's name was changed to "Blue Planet Foods".

Granola bar 

Granola bars (or muesli bars) have become popular as a snack, similar to the traditional flapjack familiar in the British Isles and Newfoundland. Granola bars consist of granola mixed with honey or other sweetened syrup, pressed and baked into a bar shape, resulting in the production of a more convenient snack. Granola bars are always individually packaged in a sealed pouch, even when a box of multiple bars is purchased. This enables people to place the packaged bar in a purse, backpack or another bag for consumption at a later point. The product is most popular in the United States, Canada, Australia, New Zealand, the United Kingdom, parts of southern Europe, Brazil, Israel, South Africa, and Japan.

Jayne Hurley, a senior nutritionist who works for the Center for Science in the Public Interest, states that granola bars are "not health food" and "[t]hey're basically cookies masquerading as health food". Compared to a Kit Kat chocolate bar, per weight, a peanut butter Nature Valley granola bar contains similar amounts of calories and fat, and significantly more sodium but half the sugar.

Matzo granola
Matzo granola is a breakfast food eaten by Jewish people during the holiday of Passover. It consists of broken up matzo pieces in place of oats.  Many variations are possible by adding other ingredients.

Notes

References 
 
 

Breakfast cereals
Breakfast
Cereals
Convenience foods
Nut dishes
Snack foods
Oat-based dishes